Great Basalt Wall is a national park in Queensland, Australia, 1124 km northwest of Brisbane. This national park protects 35,200 ha of land containing the Great Basalt Wall, a geological formation of the Toomba flow. The Toomba volcano erupted approximately 20,000 years ago, covered 670 square kilometres, and flowed for 120 km. It is one of the most recent volcanic eruptions in Queensland.  Due to the viscous nature of the rocky lava flows the park is not accessible to the public.

249 animal species inhabit the park. The elevation of the terrain is 498 meters.

See also

 Protected areas of Queensland
 List of volcanoes in Queensland

References

External links 
 Great Basalt Wall National Park facts and maps
 Toomba, Queensland, Australia

National parks of Far North Queensland
Protected areas established in 1987
1987 establishments in Australia